Justice on Trial, Inc. was established in April 2002. It is a non-profit advocacy organization for the wrongfully accused. The organization's motto is former U.S. Supreme Court Justice, Louis D. Brandeis' quote,"Sunshine is the best disinfectant," since the organization concentrates on providing the media with information on cases it handles in the hopes of exposing prosecutorial malfeasance and other corruption in the U.S. justice system. Since the advocacy's inception, it has assisted many defendants and, in 2004, was instrumental in the dismissal of the charges against Michael F. Goodwin who had been charged by the Orange County District Attorney, Tony Rackauckas, with orchestrating the 1988 murders of Mickey and Trudy Thompson in Bradbury, Los Angeles County, California.

The advocacy organization has continued working with Michael Goodwin on this case.  Los Angeles subsequently filed charges in 2004 and Goodwin was tried in 2006 for the murders.  In 2007, Goodwin was convicted.  He appealed in 2014 and the conviction was upheld by both the Appellate Court and the California Supreme Court.

Goodwin has steadfastly claimed his innocence and Justice on Trial continues to work with him and his attorneys to have the conviction reversed.

John J. Bradley is the Managing Director,

Justice on Trial, Inc. is a Nevada non-profit corporation.

References

External links
Justice on Trial

Non-profit organizations based in the United States
Organizations established in 2002